Karen M. Paget is an American political scientist, from Boulder, Colorado, United States. She is the author of non-fiction books. Her work appears at The American Prospect.

Life
She holds a doctorate from the University of Colorado and a M.A. in International Relations.

She is the author of the book  Patriotic Betrayal: The Inside Story of the CIA’s Secret Campaign to Enroll American Students in the Crusade Against Communism, launched in March 2015.

After more than a decade of research, Karen Paget gathered archival sources, declassified documents, and interviews, showing that the National Student Association story published by Ramparts, was just part of a bigger CIA operation.

Works
 Patriotic Betrayal: The Inside Story of the CIA’s Secret Campaign to Enroll American Students in the Crusade Against Communism, New Haven: Yale University Press, 2015, 
 Linda Witt; Karen M Paget; Glenna Matthews, Running as a Woman: Gender and Power The Free Press, 1993,

References

External links 

https://karenmpaget.com/

American women writers
Writers from Boulder, Colorado
Living people
National Security Agency
Central Intelligence Agency
Year of birth missing (living people)
21st-century American women